Mailen Auroux and María Irigoyen were the defending champions, having won the event in 2012, but both players chose not to defend their title; instead, opting to play at the $25,000 tournament in São José do Rio Preto, Brazil.

Sofia Shapatava and Anna Tatishvili won the tournament, defeating Claire Feuerstein and Renata Voráčová in the final, 6–4, 6–4.

Seeds

Draw

References 
 Draw

Reinert Open - Doubles
Reinert Open